Mount Berry may refer to:

 Mount Berry, Georgia, an unincorporated town in the United States
 Mount Berry (Antarctica), a mountain in Antarctica
 Berry Peak, highest point of Wrangel Island

See also
 Mount Berry Mall, Rome, Georgia, United States